Sidney Warren DeLavis (1873 – 1965) was an eminent Anglican clergyman in the 20th century.
He was born in 1873, educated at St Augustine's College, Canterbury and ordained in 1899. He was Rector of St Paul’s, Cape Town, then the area’s Archdeacon before his appointment as  Dean of Cape Town. In 1931 he was consecrated Coadjutor Bishop of Cape Town.

He died in July 1965.

Notes

1873 births
Alumni of St Augustine's College, Canterbury
Holders of a Lambeth degree
Archdeacons of The Cape
Deans of Cape Town
Anglican suffragan bishops in South Africa
1965 deaths